Thomas Jefferson Clunie (March 25, 1852 – June 30, 1903) was an American lawyer and politician who served one term as a U.S. Representative from California from 1889 to 1891.

Biography
Clunie was born in St. John's, Newfoundland on March 25, 1852, while his parents were on a visit there from Massachusetts. Clunie moved with his parents to California in 1854. Clunie moved again to Maine, and then went back to California in 1861 and attended public schools in Sacramento. Upon graduation, he studied law under the tutelage of a Harvard College graduate. He was admitted to the bar in 1868, before the age of majority, under a special act of the legislature.  He began his law practice in Sacramento in 1870.

Political life
He served as member of the State assembly in 1875. He served as delegate to the Democratic National Convention in 1884. He served in the State senate 1887-1889. He worked for the state militia, commanded the 4th Brigade, National Guard of California, before he retired as brigadier general.

Clunie was elected as a Democrat to the Fifty-first Congress. He served from March 4, 1889 to March 3, 1891. He was unsuccessful running for reelection in 1890 to the Fifty-second Congress. He resumed the practice of his profession.

Death
He died in San Francisco, California, on June 30, 1903. He was interred in the Sacramento Historic City Cemetery.

References

External links
Join California Thomas J. Clunie

1903 deaths
Democratic Party members of the United States House of Representatives from California
1852 births
American militia generals
Democratic Party California state senators
British emigrants to the United States
19th-century American politicians
Democratic Party members of the California State Assembly